Liao Zhigao (May 20, 1913 – August 28, 2000) was a politician of the People's Republic of China. He was born in Mianning, Sichuan. He joined Chinese Communist Party (CCP) in April, 1934.

Biography
In 1949 he was the secretary of CCP's Xikang committee, the governor of Xikang Province and the political commissar of provincial military region. After Sichuan and Xikang merged, he became the third secretary of CCP's Sichuan committee.

In February 1965, he became the first secretary of CCP's Sichuan committee.

He was persecuted at the beginning of Cultural Revolution in 1967, and stripped of all posts.

In November 1974, he re-merged and became the first secretary of CCP's Fujian committee, director of Fujian revolution commission, and the political commissar of Fuzhou military region.

In August 1980, his half body was paralyzed due to stroke.

In 1982, he was elected as a member of central advisory commission. 

Liao was a member of 11th Central Committee of the Chinese Communist Party.

References

1913 births
2000 deaths
Chinese Communist Party politicians from Sichuan
Politicians from Liangshan
People's Republic of China politicians from Sichuan
Political office-holders in Sichuan
Victims of the Cultural Revolution
Governors of Fujian
Delegates to the 1st National People's Congress
Delegates to the 2nd National People's Congress
Delegates to the 3rd National People's Congress
Delegates to the 4th National People's Congress
Delegates to the 5th National People's Congress
Members of the Central Advisory Commission
Delegates to the National People's Congress from Fujian
Delegates to the National People's Congress from Sichuan
Delegates to the National People's Congress from Xikang
People of the Republic of China